The German Central Command for Maritime Emergencies (CCME) (in German: Havariekommando) is the authority for mutual maritime emergency management in the German EEZ of North Sea and in the Baltic Sea. The federal office provides radar and air surveillance, piloting and emergency tugs for ships that are unable to manoeuvre. Head of CCME is Frigate captain Robby Renner.

History 
By law the German states Lower Saxony, Hanseatic City of Bremen, Hanseatic City of Hamburg, Schleswig-Holstein and Mecklenburg Vorpommern are responsible for maritime emergency response in their coastal waters. Federal agencies such as the Federal Coast Guard are responsible for certain tasks. The large number of organizations and authorities led to a great need for coordination. The process of German maritime rescue and relief operations has often been criticized as dangerously bureaucratic, too slow and uncoordinated. On October 25, 1998, the Cargo ship M/V Pallas, cargo of lumber caught fire while traveling the North Sea off the west coast of Jutland. Several attempts to get the ship under tow were unsuccessful, and it ran aground four days later off the German island of Amrum, in the Schleswig-Holstein Wadden Sea National Park. 250 tons of fuel oil were lost overboard, causing the biggest oil spill in German history, killing approximately 16.000 sea birds, predominantly common eiders. The case led to political discontent over a lack of coordinated emergency tow capabilities on the German coast, and contributed to the creation CCME.

The Federal Coastal States and the Federal Government authorities founded CCME. On January 1, 2003, the Central Command for Maritime Emergencies (CCME) (in German: Havariekommando) commenced operations. It was established to set up and carry out a mutual maritime emergency management in the North Sea and in the Baltic Sea. It is based in Cuxhaven (Northwest Germany) and is headed by a federal official.

Operation 

 
The Maritime Emergencies Reporting and Assessment Centre is the 24/7 central point of contact for emergencies.
In the event of an accident, it is usually necessary to rescue people, which is coordinated by the Maritime Rescue Coordination Centre Bremen (MRCC) of the German Sea Rescue Society (DGzRS). The havariekommando is in charge of the German ETV fleet. During daily work routine the CCME consists of about 40 employees, working in five different sections:

 Maritime Emergencies Reporting and Assessment Centre (MERAC)
 Marine Pollution Control - High Sea and Salvage Section
 Marine Pollution Control - Coastal Section
 Fire Fighting, Rescue and Medical Response Section
 Public Relations Section

Capacity 
One of the main capacities of CCME is a number of Emergency tow vessels.

Emergency tow vessel stations

Special ability capacitys
The CCME has access and is in command of units of several organisations with special ability and equipment:

 DGzRS for maritime rescue
 Fire brigades, local coastal fire brigades with special ability for maritime fire fighting
 German Navy, especially naval aviation
 German Federal Coast Guard
Federal Police
 Federal Agency for Technical Relief (THW) for handling dangerous substances

References

German federal agencies
Water transport in Germany
2003 establishments in Germany
Cuxhaven
Cuxhaven